The National Museum of Computing is a museum in the United Kingdom dedicated to collecting and restoring historic computer systems.  The museum is based in rented premises at Bletchley Park in Milton Keynes, Buckinghamshire and opened in 2007. The building — Block H — was the first purpose-built computer centre in the world, hosting six Colossus computers by the end of World War II.

The museum houses a rebuilt Mark 2 Colossus computer alongside an exhibition of the most complex code cracking activities performed at the Park, along with examples of machines continuing the history of the development of computing from the 1940s to the present day. The museum has a policy of having as many of the exhibits as possible in full working order.

Although located on the Bletchley Park "campus", The National Museum of Computing is an entirely separate registered charity with its own fund-raising and separate entrance/ticketing. TNMOC receives no public funding and relies on the generosity of donors and supporters.

Exhibits

On display in the museum are many famous early computing era machines, including a functioning Colossus Mark 2 computer that was rebuilt between 1993 and 2008 by a team of volunteers led by Tony Sale. Colossus was a machine that helped break enemy encryption during World War II.  
Since 2018, the reconstruction of the Turing-Welchman Bombe, of the type used to help break Enigma, is also at the museum.

The museum also includes the world's oldest working digital computer (the Harwell Dekatron / WITCH), machines from the 1960s such as the Marconi Transistorised Automatic Computer (T.A.C.), Elliott 803 and 905, an ICL 2966 mainframe from the 1980s, an IBM 1130 from the 1960s, an analogue computer, a hands-on retrocomputing gallery, and several restoration projects such as the PDP-8 and the PDP-11-based air traffic control system from London Terminal Control Centre at West Drayton near London. Further exhibits include mechanical and electronic calculators, a history of slide rules, a pair of Cray supercomputers, and a personal computing gallery with ten hands-on machines. Visitors can also see a re-build of the Cambridge University EDSAC computer that is underway (still in progress as of May 2019).

There is also a suite which includes many BBC Micro personal computers which are used to encourage programming among visitors, a temporary exhibition space used for short-term exhibitions and a hands on display of video game consoles from different eras. All of this is alongside various other displays of devices and information regarding the evolution of computing from the 1960s to the modern era.

Since 2009, the National Physical Laboratory (NPL) has sponsored a gallery about technology of the Internet, featuring the pioneering work on packet switching carried out at NPL and the development of the first public data networks.

The museum has its own cafe and gift shop.

Opening
The museum is open to the public 6 days a week, Tuesday to Sunday from 10:30 am to 5 pm, and most school and bank holidays. There are guided tours at 2pm on Tuesday and Wednesday, and 10:30am on Thursday. Booking for tours is recommended as there are limited places. There is a modest admission charge to the museum to help cover overheads and they now offer family and annual tickets.

Demonstrations and talks in the Colossus and Tunny Galleries usually occur on the hour when the galleries are open, with slight changes depending on the number of visitors.

Funding
TNMOC entirely depends on voluntary and corporate donations and modest admission charges. Fund-raising continues and donors have included Bletchley Park Capital Partners, Fujitsu, Google UK, CreateOnline, Ceravision, Insight software, PGP Corporation, IBM, NPL, HP Labs, British Computer Society (BCS), Black Marble, and the School of Computer Science at the University of Hertfordshire.

The museum conducted a crowdfunding campaign in March 2018 to raise funds to build a new gallery for the Turing-Welchman Bombe. The campaign raised over £43,000 via crowd-funding and an additional £20,000 via direct donations.

References

External links

 Museum website

Bletchley Park
Buildings and structures in Milton Keynes
Charities based in England
Computer museums
Computer museums in the United Kingdom
Computer science education in the United Kingdom
History museums in Buckinghamshire
Museums established in 2007